Military conscription in Israel refers to the mandatory draft in Israel which applies to Israelis of three ethnicities: Jews (both genders), Druze (male only), and Circassians (male only). Under Israeli law, only men are drafted from the less numerous Druze and Circassians, whereas Jewish women are also required to serve alongside Jewish men. Muslim and Christian Arab citizens of Israel (both genders) may enlist voluntarily, but they have never been conscripted by law.

The increasingly numerous ultra-Orthodox Jews are typically exempted from military service under a clause from the Ben-Gurion era known as Torato Umanuto (Torah study is his job), causing increasing friction in Israeli society when it comes to "sharing the burden" of national duty. 

, the minimum required length of military service is two years and eight months (with some roles requiring an additional four months of service) for all conscripted men, and two years (with some roles requiring an additional eight months of service) for conscripted Jewish women. All resident citizens under the age of 40 who have completed their mandatory military service are, unless exempted, eligible to be called up for reserve duty.

History

According to the Israeli Defense Service Law, which regulates duties and exceptions, all Israeli citizens who meet the conscription criteria are required to serve once they reach 18 years of age unless they qualify for any of the above-mentioned exemptions.

In 1949, after the founding of the State of Israel, the Defense Service Law gave the IDF the authority to enlist any citizen. Draftees would then be required to show up for the draft in accordance with the military's decision to enlist them. Under this law, the period of service for men was 30 months and for women 18 months (although in accordance with a temporary order from January 10, 1968, six additional months were added to the mandatory service, 36 months for men and 24 months for women respectively.) The service for men has been reduced to 32 months since 2015. In 2020 the service for men was reduced to 30 months following a decision made in 2016, in 2021 this change was reverted and the reduction in service length was postponed to 2024.
The draft requirement applies to any citizen or permanent resident who has reached the age of 18, and in accordance with the law, the individuals who are exempt from the draft are dismissed for various reasons, such as incapability, medical problems, military personnel needs, etc. Many of the soldiers who complete their mandatory military service are later obligated to serve in a reserve unit in accordance with the military's needs.

Economic constraints on the IDF have caused them to reconsider their structure and slowly shift towards a more modern military. A shift towards a professional militia has caused the IDF to adopt more career-oriented attributes, thus becoming more selective than in prior years. Instead of focusing on “role expansion,” Israel, most specifically its government, is focusing on “nation building.”  One of the most recent developments is a focus on inclusivity of gay and especially disabled citizens.
In 2013, 26 percent of all potential conscripts were exempted from military service in the Israel Defense Forces; 13.5 percent for religious reasons, 4 percent for psychological reasons, 2 percent for physical health reasons, 3 percent due to existing criminal records, and 3 percent due to residing abroad.

Medical profiles

The IDF determines a medical profile for each soldier; according to that profile, the army decides where to assign the draftees. The highest medical profile draftees serve in the five infantry Brigades, Field/Combat Intelligence units, and Combat engineers. The second highest medical profiles are assigned to serve in the Armoured Corps, Artillery, Military Police, Border Police, and Aman. The lowest acceptable level of medical profiles are drafted into the combat support and combat service support Arms, such as the Adjutant Corps, Logistics Corps, and the Ordnance Corps. Draftees with lower than acceptable profiles (Profile 21) and draftees diagnosed as not suitable for military service are fully exempted from military obligations. The highest profile is 97.

Exemption from service

Although military service in Israel is  compulsory, exemptions can be secured on religious, physical, psychological, or legal grounds. There is also a growing, but still very rare, phenomenon of draft dodging,  mainly due to conscience or political reasons (See Refusal to serve in the IDF). Exemptions have come under attack on grounds of fairness, and also because of a perceived shortage of combat personnel.

Yeshiva students who declare that "Torah study is their occupation" (Torato Umanuto) can delay their conscription as long as they continue their studies, under the so-called Tal Law (see: Tal Committee). In practice, many of them end up never serving at all. This is a very controversial issue in Israel and key component of religious relations in Israel. Several attempts were made to change the practice, notably the establishment of the Tal committee in 1999, which led to the Tal Law, implemented in 2002. Yet the Torato Umanuto exemption continued largely unchanged. The Tal Law was later ruled unconstitutional in its current form, and a replacement is needed before August 2012. Most beneficiaries of this exemption are Haredi Jews. Members of the Religious Zionist sector often serve within a separate system called Hesder, a concept developed by Rabbi Yehuda Amital, which combines advanced Talmudic studies with military service in the Israel Defense Forces. The IDF also tends to make the military service easier for recruits at an older age and recruits with families; as well as high-ranked sportspeople and artists (musicians, models, actors, and social media influencers) of note.

From time to time a public debate emerges in Israel around the issue of exemption from military service in Israel.

A basic law of Israel is the Israeli Defense Service Law. It lists the guidelines and regulations of mandated military service in Israel. Some regulation includes age, duties, service requirements, time of service, etc. Chapter 5: Reserve Service: Going Abroad covers the rules and requirements for going on becoming a temporary reserve and going abroad. 
(a)	A person designated for defense service and a person of military age who belongs to the regular forces of the Israel Defense Forces shall not go abroad unless granted a permit from the Minister of Defense.
(b)	 A person of military age the continuance of whose regular service has been deferred for any reason shall not go abroad during the period of deferment save under a permit from the Minister of Defense.
(c) A permit under this section may be unconditional or subject to conditions, including a condition relating to the holder's stay abroad.
(e) Where any of the conditions of the permit is not fulfilled, the Minister of Defense may revoke the permit and may direct him, by order, to return to Israel within the time prescribed in the order.
(f) The Minister of Defense shall not exercise his power under subsection (e) before he has given the holder of the permit an opportunity to state his case to him.

The IDF had strict restraints on letting individuals go into the reserves, even if just temporarily because of their high risk of attack from neighboring states. Through the dissolution of partnerships and peace treaties in recent years, that threat has reduced considerably. Consequently, the high demand for IDF soldiers has slightly decreased as well.

Specific population groups
 The IDF does not conscript Arab citizens of Israel who are Muslim or Christian, however, they may choose to volunteer for military service. For Druze and Circassian men, enlistment is mandatory.
 Yeshiva students who declare that "Torah study is their profession" (Torato Umanuto) could previously delay their conscription as long as they continue their studies, under the so-called Tal Law until it was repealed
 Female draftees who state that they maintain a religious Jewish way of life are exempt from military service, and many of them choose to volunteer for an alternative national service called Sherut Leumi.
 Male members of the Religious Zionist sector often serve within a separate system called Hesder, a concept developed by Rabbi Yehuda Amital, which combines advanced Talmudic studies with military service in the Israel Defense Forces. A five year program, which normally entails serving for a year and five months instead of three years and learning for three years and 7 months.
 Draftees who state that they are pacifists are required to appear before a committee tasked with examining the credibility of their claim. Exemption from service is granted if the committee is persuaded that their pacifism is sincere and meets the agreed criteria. Only a few individuals each year are granted an exemption on grounds of pacifism; all other self-declared pacifists are required to enlist.
 Immigrants who immigrate to Israel at the age of recruitment get various concessions in their military service.
 Draftees with a physical or psychological disability which are exempt from military service may still volunteer to serve. It can be a symbolic service of four hours a day, but they might also end up serving in full-time military service.
 Leading active athletes might in many cases be granted an "Outstanding athlete" status which allows them to get a more convenient and shorter service, so they can continue to develop their career and represent Israel abroad in international competitions. The "Outstanding athlete" status is given only to athletes competing in Olympic sports. In addition, the military also grants the similar "Outstanding dancer" status and an "Outstanding musician" status. This status is granted in the same way and after the individuals have been examined. They may also be granted a more convenient service so that they can continue to improve their abilities and career during military service.

Draft process
The military draft process occurs in the following steps:
The Army calls upon a potential soldier in a letter and this is called the "First Calling" or Tzav Rishon. This letter states that the teenager must report to a certain place at a certain time for a day-long examination and interviewing.
After careful looking over of the Tzav Rishon's results the army will call the people to enlist when they turn a certain age to begin the army process and basic training.

Deferment
There are various routes which allow the draftees to postpone the date of recruitment. An automatic postponement is granted for student to graduate from high school. Additional routes which lead to the postponing of the recruitment:
 Volunteering for a one-year service in a youth organization.
 Postponement of conscription due to the IDF needs, usually due to a course beginning in a date which occurs later than the original drafting date given to the draftee.
 Postponement of conscription due to various personal reasons.
 One can postpone the draft in a year in order to go to Torah studies.
 One can postpone the draft as part of the Hesder agreement.

Academic programs
 Academic Reserve - a program designed to enlist and train soldiers which have an academic background in fields vital to the military's needs.
 Talpiot program - an elite training program for young people who have demonstrated outstanding academic ability in the sciences, physics and mathematics. Graduates of the Talpiot program pursue higher education while serving in the army, and then utilize their expertise to further IDF research and development.
  The pilot course also offers a Tal college degree.
  The Israeli Naval Academy (קורס חובלים), whose candidates study for a degree from the Haifa University during the course.

Incompatibility and adjustment difficulties
During the drafting process sometimes draftees get exempted from the draft because of incompatibility. Sometimes the incompatibility of an individual is determined later on during his or her military service, and leads to dismissal from the army. The incompatibility may stem from various reasons:

 Criminal record or history of using drugs.
 Low motivation to serve.

When there is a surplus of recruits, the military often raises the threshold required of recruits, and grants an exemption due to incompatibility to a much larger number of recruits. In addition, there is a widespread phenomenon of granting exemption from military service because of incompatibility to female candidates who were identified as having a low medical profile and/or low motivation to serve. In such cases the reason for the exemption would usually be stated as: "Excess of female recruits."

The IDF can also determine that a draftee has adjustment difficulties. A soldier with adjustment difficulties would not serve as a combat soldier.

Volunteering
A draftee found unfit for military service may still choose to volunteer for military service; their status will be similar to all the other draftees found to be fit for service. Once enlisted, these volunteers cannot choose to quit the military early.

Civilian national service 

There is an alternative voluntary civilian national service in Israel for those that cannot or do not wish to serve in the Israel Defense Forces. Most participants are Jewish women from the Religious Zionist sector.

Future
The IDF has reportedly concluded that it will, at some point in the future, have to end conscription in favor of an all-volunteer force. Reasons include growing unpopularity of military service among Israeli youth, a growth in draft-dodging, and budgetary constraints that would prevent the IDF from conscripting all those eligible even if draft-dodging were not an issue. Israel is reportedly studying how the United States and European nations ended conscription and transitioned to all-volunteer forces, for a possible future transition.

See also 
 Israel Defense Forces
 Women in the Israel Defense Forces
 Reserve duty (Israel)

References

External links
 IDF: Nearly 28% of Israeli males avoided conscription in 2007 - published in Haaretz
 Dodging Israel's draft - published on BBC News
 Israel confronts flagging interest in military service - published in washingtonpost.com

 
Military of Israel
Israel